Gollaprolu is a town in Kakinada district of the Indian state of Andhra Pradesh. It is a Municipality in Gollaprolu mandal of Kakinada revenue division. Business is the main occupation of this town. The town also forms a part of Godavari Urban Development Authority.

Geography 

The region is cyclone-prone with agricultural dependant. The villagers are known for growing one of the most sought after varieties of hot pepper and is famous for the production of onions, ground nuts, cotton and rice.

Governance
The town was upgraded from Gram panchayat to Municipality on 23 June 2011.
Commissioner P.Sai babu

Transport

Gollaprolu is located on National Highway 216.Gollaprolu Railway Station is located on Howrah-Chennai main line. Rajahmundry Airport is 60km from the town.

Education 

Sri Seth Peraji Lumbaji Zilla Parishat High School

References

External links

Cities and towns in Kakinada district